Max Brown (born 10 February 1981) is a British actor.

Early life
Brown was born in Ilkley, Yorkshire, and spent most of his childhood in the town of Shrewsbury, Shropshire. He has two sisters, Chloe and Phoebe. Brown's father is a civil servant and his mother a governor at a family support charity. Brown was drawn to acting from an early age after moving schools at a young age. He performed in plays regularly at the local Music Hall in Shrewsbury.

Career
Brown first appeared on screens playing the heartthrob Danny Hartston in Grange Hill (2001). He has gone on to appear in several television shows, including Crossroads, Hollyoaks, Doctors, Casualty, Mistresses and The Tudors. In 2010, he was cast as MI5 Piracy and Terrorism Case Officer Dimitri Levendis in the BBC One drama series Spooks until its final season in 2011. He originated the role of Adam Wainwright in Foyle's War, though the role needed to be re-cast when Brown moved to the United States. Brown also played Evan Marks in the first eighteen episodes of the first season of The CW's Beauty and the Beast.

Brown has appeared in films including Turistas (released as Paradise Lost in the UK) and Daylight Robbery. In 2011, he played the role of Wagner in the British independent comedy film Flutter.

He also appeared in the last two seasons of the television series The Royals as Prince Robert who later becomes King.  In 2019, he was cast in the Downton Abbey film as the King's Valet, Richard Ellis, and a romantic interest of Thomas Barrow.

Personal life
Brown is married to model Annabelle Horsey and they have three children together, two daughters and a son.

Filmography

References

External links
 
 Max Brown at Rotten Tomatoes

1981 births
21st-century English male actors
English male film actors
Living people
Actors from Shropshire
Male actors from Yorkshire
People from Ilkley
Actors from Shrewsbury
English male soap opera actors